The fourth series of Love Island, a British dating reality show, began on 4 June 2018 on ITV2, and concluded on 30 July 2018. It is the fourth from the current revived series, but sixth overall. Caroline Flack presented the series, while Iain Stirling narrated it. The series opener received the highest rating on a digital TV programme since the 2012 Summer Olympics were broadcast on BBC Three; it was also the most watched programme ever on ITV2.

On 30 July 2018, the series was won by Dani Dyer and Jack Fincham having received 79.66% of the final vote, making this the biggest winning percentage since the show began. Laura Anderson and Paul Knops finished as runners-up. The average viewers for this series was 3.96 million, up 1.44 million on the previous series.

Production
During the final of the previous series on 24 July 2017, it was confirmed that Love Island would return for a fourth series due to air the following year. It becomes the fourth series from the current revived format, but sixth series overall. Caroline Flack and Iain Stirling were confirmed to continue their roles as presenter and narrator, respectively. The first 10-second teaser for the new series began airing on 21 April 2018 with a second teaser released on 29 April. A full-length trailer was released on 17 May, which Stephanie Chase of Digital Spy pointed out included "all our favourite lingo from the show". On 23 May, it was confirmed that the series would begin on 4 June on ITV2. On 27 May, it was announced that a new spin-off, "Love Island: The Morning After", had been commissioned for the series. It is hosted by Kem Cetinay and Arielle Free and is a daily podcast delivering the freshest gossip to the fans. First look pictures of the villa were released on 31 May. The sixteenth episode of the series, first broadcast on 21 June 2018, features a tribute to series 2 contestant Sophie Gradon, who died on 20 June.

Some of the episodes in this series were aired outside of the usual 9pm timeslot due to the FIFA World Cup.

Islanders

Angela Jain, the managing director at ITV Studios Entertainment, wanted the series to feature "some surprising cast members", who the audience would not expect to see. She explained that she wanted "enough cast that feels like they are absolutely heart and soul Love Island – and then a certain percentage of people who feel genuinely new to telly and genuinely surprising." When asked whether a former contestant could appear in this series, executive producer Andy Cadman did not rule out anything, but said he struggled to imagine it. The first Islanders for the fourth series were released on 28 May 2018, just one week before the launch. However, throughout the series, more Islanders entered the villa to find love. Niall Aslam's decision to leave the series voluntarily for "personal reasons" marks the first time since the second series where an Islander voluntarily left the show. Niall later said he left because of "stress-induced psychosis." The series was won by Dani Dyer and Jack Fincham having received 79.66% of the final vote.

Coupling
The couples were chosen shortly after the contestants entered the villa. After all of the girls entered, the boys were asked to choose a girl to pair up with. Alex G was paired with Samira, Eyal with Hayley, Jack Fi and Dani paired up, Niall and Kendall coupled up, and Wes paired up with Laura A. Adam then entered the villa and was told he would be stealing one of the girls the following day.

Notes

 : Adam arrived after the coupling on Day 1, but was told he would be able to steal a girl for himself on Day 2. He chose Kendall.
 : Original Islanders were only given the option to remain in their current couple, or re-couple with one of the new Islanders.
 : After the public voted for their favourite couple, on Day 33 it was announced that Adam & Darylle, Alex M & Megan, and Ellie J & Sam had the fewest votes. It was then down to the only single Islanders Georgia and Wes to couple up with one of them, and therefore save them from being dumped. Georgia chose to couple up with Sam, and Wes chose Megan.
 : After being chosen by their fellow Islanders, Georgia and Sam were given the choice to leave as a couple or remain in the villa but stay single. They decided to stay, meaning they were not permitted to couple up during the next recoupling. However, during the recoupling both refused to couple with anybody else meaning they had to leave the villa.

Casa Amor
On 27 June 2017, it was confirmed that ‘Casa Amor’ would be reintroduced following its success during the previous series. It is a second villa featuring new Islanders in a twist designed to put the couples to the ultimate test. Twelve new Islanders were introduced during this twist. The villa was called ’Casa Amor’ which translates to ’Love House’, and is located not far from the main villa. The new Islanders for the twist included six girls; Charlie, Darylle, Ellie, Grace, Kazimir and Savanna, as well as six boys; Alex, Charlie, Dean, Frankie, Jack and Jordan.

The twist came to its conclusion four days later when the original Islanders were given the choice of remaining with their current partner in the opposite villa or couple up with one of the new Islanders. However, as they were living in separate villas, they were not aware of each other's choice. If one decided to re-couple and the other did not, then the one that didn't would be single but still remain on the island. If both re-coupled then they would both remain in the villa with their new partner, and any remaining single new islanders would be dumped. At the end of this, Georgia and Wes became the only single original Islanders, and Charlie W, Dean, Jordan and Savanna were dumped.

Weekly summary
The main events in the Love Island villa are summarised in the table below.

Ratings
Official ratings are taken from BARB and include ITV2 +1. Because the Saturday episodes are weekly catch-up episodes rather than nightly highlights, these are not included in the overall averages. The series launch on 4 June 2018 was the most watched digital TV programme since the 2012 Summer Olympics were broadcast on BBC Three, and the most watched ever on ITV2, this was overtaken by the episode that aired on 8 July 2018 which had 4.46 million viewers.

References

2018 British television seasons
Love Island (2015 TV series)